Steingrímur Rohloff (born 1971) is an Icelandic-German composer.

Early life
Rohloff was born in Reykjavik, Iceland in 1971, to an Icelandic mother and a German father. Rohloff studied composition with Krzysztof Meyer at the "Musikhochschule Köln". Supported by DAAD he went to the Conservatoire national superieur de Paris to study composition with Gérard Grisey and Marco Stroppa, electronic music with Laurent Cuniot and Louis Naon and orchestration with Marc-André Dalbavie.  In 1999 he got selected for a course at the IRCAM in Paris. In 2001-2003 he studied electronic music with Hans-Ulrich Humpert.

Career
Steingrimur Rohloff has received numerous prizes for his compositions.  His orchestral works Sol, Gravitation and the Saxophone Concerto were first performed in Gothenburg, Saarbrücken and Oslo and received a lot of attention, when he was awarded the Bernd-Alois-Zimmermann-Prize of the City of Cologne in Germany in 2003.  This prize was mainly given to him because of those large orchestral pieces, which the jury called "of an original fantasy... a virtuoso technique in the treatment of the orchestra...melodic invention...exciting colour-developments..."

His works have been performed in more than 25 countries worldwide.

References

External links and sources 

1971 births
Conservatoire de Paris alumni
German composers
German people of Icelandic descent
Icelandic composers
Icelandic people of German descent
Living people
Pupils of Gérard Grisey